Kevin Lamont Bouie (born August 18, 1971) is a former American football running back who played four seasons in the National Football League (NFL) with the San Diego Chargers and Arizona Cardinals. He was drafted by the Philadelphia Eagles in the seventh round of the 1995 NFL Draft. He played college football at Mississippi State University and attended Pahokee High School in Pahokee, Florida.

References

External links
Just Sports Stats
College stats
Fanbase profile

Living people
1971 births
Players of American football from Florida
American football running backs
African-American players of American football
Mississippi State Bulldogs football players
San Diego Chargers players
Arizona Cardinals players
People from Pahokee, Florida
Pahokee High School alumni
21st-century African-American sportspeople
20th-century African-American sportspeople